All Japan Kickboxing Federation (ja: 全日本キックボクシング連盟, A.J.K.F.) was the Japan-based sanctioning and promoting body of professional kickboxing. It was established in 1987 and it was dissolved in 2009. The informal name was "Zen Nihon Kikku. Masato who won K-1 World Max in 2003 debuted as a professional kickboxer at AJKF.

History

Establishment
All Japan Kickboxing Federation (AJKF) was established in July 1987 by former members of the Martial Arts Japan Kickboxing Federation (MAJKF). This withdrawing was caused by Jun Nishikawa, the owner of Nishikawa Gym, and Toshio Kaneda, the event promoter. They enticed all of the current champions and other kickboxing gyms from MAJKF. The champions were sanctioned as the first champions of AJKF automatically.
After establishment of AJKF, other gyms joined AJKF before holding the 1st AJKF event. The gyms which joined AJKF were AKI gym, Nishikawa gym, Hikari gym, Oguni gym, Fudokan, Fuji gym, Iwamoto gym, and Yamato gym.

Makoto Fujita was chosen for the chairman, Kenji Kurosaki was chosen for the counselor, Ichiro Ozawa the member of the House of Representatives of Japan was chosen for the commissioner. At that time,

On July 15, 1987, AJKF hold its first event at Korakuen Hall in Tokyo. The main bout was the match between Tetsuya Sakiyama and Lakchart from Thailand. After the establishment of AJKF, Kaneda got power to control AJKF because he knew the show business very well as he had been working for the event company for long time. He told "Nissho" a company which he worked as a managing director to establish "Nissho Enterprize" which is a show business company. He assumed its CEO. This company had got strong power, so it was regarded as the actual body of AJKF. In addition, "All Japan Enterprize" which was the company Kaneda had worked before cooperated with World Kickboxing Association(WKA), Fuhita the chairman of AJKF also held the post of vice-president of WKA. For this reason, he could invite famous foreign kickboxers from Europe and North America including Maurice Smith, Rob Kaman, and Peter Smit.

In the end of the 1980s, Nissho left Nisho Enterprize. Nisho Enterprize changed its name to "All japan Enterprize" and started inviting more other famous foreign kickboxers. In the beginning of the 1990s, the popularity of AJKF started decreasing, and AJKF were hard up for money.

Split (NJKF)
In 1996, AJKF was broken up to two organizations. The New Japan Kickboxing Federation (NJKF) was established by Makoto Fujita who was the chairman of AJKF. The NJKF side enticed many kickboxing gyms, kickboxers and 3 current champions from AJKF. The Featherweight champion Hideaki Suzuki, the Lightweight champion Yasuhiro Uchida and the Welterweight champion Shinji Matsuura.

Bankruptcy and rebirth
In May 1997, AJKF cooperated with K-1, and moved its headquarters to Kinshicho in Sumida, Tokyo. Moreover, AJKF opened a new kickboxing gym "K Public gym" there. In addition, AJKF asked Hiroyuki Yoshino who was the former Japanese national champion of professional boxing to join AJKF. AJKF sent some top kickboxers to K-1 event twice (July 20, November 9), but Atsushi Tateshima who was one of the most famous kickboxer in Japan refused to take part in K-1.

In October 1997, All Japan Enterprize was bankrupted and AJKF lost its true body. All of the members of the staff left AJKF. After the bankruptcy, some high-powered gyms established the board of directors and started managing AJKF. And then, AJKF moved its office to Higashi-Azabu in Minato, Tokyo. For this event, AJKF changed its system. All kickboxing events are held by each kickboxing gym individually instead of the headquarters of AJKF or event company.

Split (J-NET)
Although AJKF started controlling kickboxing again, "Active J" which is one of kickboxing gym joined AJKF tried to continue holding event by themselves. This was regarded as an infringement of AJKF rules. Moreover, the representative of Active J ignored recommendation to participate the board of directors. For this reason, Active J was dismissed from AJKF. After dismissal, Active J established J-NETWORK(J-NET), and set gyms under the direct management of Active J up in business, and make them join J-NET. Keita Kainuma the current AJKF Bantamweight and some famous kickboxers moved to J-NET because of this incident. Takayuki Kohiruimaki was one of them.

Split (K-U)
Hachoji FSG and other kickboxing gyms which were members of AJKF set a press conference on June 14, 1998, and announced that they are going to establish a new kickboxing organization "Kick Boxing-Union" (K-U). 14 kickboxing gyms and the 3 current AJKF champions moved to K-U. The Featherweight champion Shinya Sakuma, the Lightweight champion Nobumitsu Sudo and the Welterweight champion Tatsuya Suzuki.

Decline
On June 1, 1998, Kaneda returned to a representative of AJKF, and it started controlling the kickboxing events again. The office was moved to Asao-ku, Kawasaki in Kanagawa. At that time, AJKF improved relationship to J-NET because people who disliked J-NET had already removed to K-U. Actually, the event held by J-NET on February 2, many kickboxers from AJKF participated in it. Moreover, many kickboxers from J-NET participated in the tournament for the vacant AJKF tiles (Lightweight and Featherweight) held by AJKF. For these the interchange between AJKF and J-NET became active.

In 1999, AJKF got a new sponsor, and they removed their office to kitashinjuku in Shinjuku, Tokyo on May 28. They established their 2 official kickboxing gyms(AJ Public gym and Sakushin-kaikan) there as an annex to the office. After removal, Kensaku Maeda who was one of the top kickboxer left AJKF, but Satoshi Kobayashi and his gym "Fujiwara gym" rejoined AJKF . On November 30, Taniyama gym left AJKF.

In March 2000, Masato became independent from AJKF and he established Silver Wolf.

On May 11, 2007, Satoshi Kobayashi, former kickboxer, assumed the general manager of AJKF.

Arrest and dissolution 
In 2008, AJKF started new series event "Krush" with K-1, and the Krush implementation committee was established.  The bout in Krush was under K-1 rules.

On June 21, 2009, Kobayashi, the general manager, produced the event "The stray dog Blitz tactics 2009", but it became the last event of AJKF.

On June 22, Toshio Kaneda, the AJKF representative, was arrested for helping sham marriage for a Korean woman. He was suspected of "making False Entries in the Original of Notarized Deeds"(Article 157) and "using it".  In addition, the manager of sham marriage was a criminal syndicate (yakuza), and AJKF was suspected as they had a relationship with yakuza because the building which the office of AJKF located accepted some front companies for organized crime operations. At that day, the AJKF office was searched and seized, and Kaneda was relieved from his duty.

On July 15, the office was closed and AJKF was dissolved in between July 15 and August 20.

Championship history

Flyweight championship
Weight limit: 112 lbs

Bantamweight championship
Weight limit: 118 lbs

Featherweight championship
Weight limit: 124 lbs

Super Featherweight championship
Weight limit: 130 lbs

Lightweight championship
Weight limit: 136 lbs

Welterweight championship
Weight limit: 148 lbs

Super Welterweight championship
Weight limit: 154 lbs

Middleweight championship
Weight limit: 160 lbs

Heavvweight championship
Weight limit: + 160 lbs

References

External links
Official blog of AJKF(Japanese)
TitleHistories.com: AJKF

Kickboxing organizations
Defunct sports governing bodies in Japan
Sports organizations established in 1987
Organizations disestablished in 2009
1987 establishments in Japan
2009 disestablishments in Japan
Kickboxing in Japan